The 9th British Academy Video Game Awards awarded by the British Academy of Film and Television Arts, is an award ceremony that was held on 5 March 2013 in the London Hilton on Park Lane. The ceremony honoured achievement in video gaming in 2012 and was hosted by Dara Ó Briain. This was the first ceremony to introduce the award for British Game, and has been present in every ceremony thus far.

Winners and nominees
Winners are shown first in bold.

Academy Fellowship
Gabe Newell

Games with multiple nominations and wins

Nominations

Wins

External links
9th BAFTA Video Games Awards page

British Academy Games Awards ceremonies
2013 awards in the United Kingdom
2012 in video gaming
March 2013 events in the United Kingdom